"My Sharona" is the debut single by the Knack. The song was written by Berton Averre and Doug Fieger, and it was released in 1979 from their debut album, Get the Knack. It reached number one on the Billboard Hot 100 singles chart, where it remained for six weeks, and was number one on Billboards 1979 Top Pop Singles year-end chart.

It was certified gold by the Recording Industry Association of America, representing 500,000 copies sold, and was Capitol Records' fastest gold status debut single since the Beatles' "I Want to Hold Your Hand" in 1964. It has since gone on to sell more than 10 million copies as of 2010.

Inspiration
When Doug Fieger was 25 years old, he met 17-year-old Sharona Alperin, who inspired a two-month-long run of songwriting, as well as eventually becoming his girlfriend for the next four years. Fieger recounted that "It was like getting hit in the head with a baseball bat; I fell in love with her instantly. And when that happened, it sparked something and I started writing a lot of songs feverishly in a short amount of time." Fieger and Averre worked out the structure and melody of the song. Averre was originally averse to using Alperin's name in the song, but Fieger wanted it to be a direct expression of his feelings; Averre ultimately relented. Fieger claimed that "My Sharona" was written in 15 minutes; moreover, it was purportedly mixed in an additional 15 minutes after the recording of the song was made in a single take (not including background vocals).

Fieger and Alperin were engaged at one point but never married. In a 2005 interview, Fieger said that they remained "great friends"; additionally, she would visit him frequently as Fieger was dying of cancer. Alperin went on to have a successful career as a realtor in Los Angeles.

Music and lyrics
The music of the song echoes many elements of songs from the 1960s. According to a Trouser Press reviewer, the song's main melodic hook is "an inversion of the signature riff" from "Gimme Some Lovin'", a 1966 song by the Spencer Davis Group. Fieger acknowledged that the song's tom-tom drum rhythm is "just a rewrite" of "Going to a Go-Go", a song from Smokey Robinson and the Miracles from 1965. Drummer Bruce Gary has stated that although he did not particularly like the song when Fieger introduced it to the band, he came up with the stuttering beat for the song similar to a surf stomp, with just tom-tom and snare. He also decided to incorporate a flam, in which two drum strokes are staggered, creating a fuller sound, which Gary considered to be crucial to the song's success.

In an interview with The Washington Post, Fieger claimed that the song was written from the perspective of a 14-year-old boy.

The song's stuttering vocal effect of the repeated "muh muh muh my Sharona" phrase is reminiscent of Roger Daltrey's vocals in the 1965 song "My Generation" by the Who.

Music video
The music video features the band performing the song in a white room. Another music video features clips from the film Reality Bites, concert footage and Another Lousy Day in Paradise music video.

Artwork
In addition to being the inspiration for the song, Sharona Alperin posed for the single's picture sleeve holding a copy of the Knack's debut studio album Get the Knack.

Reception
Produced by Mike Chapman, the song's clean sound was also reminiscent of the sound of the 1960s British Invasion. Billboard Magazine described "My Sharona" as "an energetic raker with a subtle melody." Dick Nusser of Billboard remarked on the song's "catchy, deliberately awkward, stop-go drum and guitar breaks", its "quirky lyrics" and "suggestive tone", and that the song will "make you ready, willing and able to hum the refrain at the right moment." Cash Box said it begins with "slamming drums and rock steady, building guitar work." In the Pazz & Jop 1979 Critic's Poll, "My Sharona" and Fleetwood Mac's "Tusk" were tied for sixth place in the list of top singles of the year.

Chris Woodstra of AllMusic has subsequently referred to the song as an "unforgettable hit." The New Rolling Stone Album Guide claimed that the song "was a hit for a good reason. The beat is urgent, the chorus calls out for drunken shouting along and the guitar solo is a firecracker flash."

Legacy
The New York Times called the song "an emblem of the new wave era in rock and a prime example of the brevity of pop fame."

During the making of Michael Jackson's 1982 Thriller album, producer Quincy Jones aspired to include a rock-and-roll-inspired song in the vein of "My Sharona." Jackson subsequently wrote "Beat It".

In 2008, "My Sharona" was ranked in two Billboard 50th anniversary charts. It ranked 75 on the Billboard Hot 100 All-Time Top Songs and 16 on the Top Billboard Hot 100 Rock Songs.

In 1994, "My Sharona" re-entered the Billboard Hot 100 chart and peaked at number 91, when it was released as part of the Reality Bites soundtrack album. In the film itself, the characters dance to the song at a convenience store. This version was remixed by Dave Jerden and features, among other changes, a much more prominent drum sound.<ref>{{cite web|title= Reality Bites: Original Motion Picture Soundtrack |website= Discogs |url= https://www.discogs.com/Various-Reality-Bites-Original-Motion-Picture-Soundtrack/release/1912100 |access-date= February 25, 2017}}</ref>

In 2005, the song gained some attention when it appeared on the playlist of U.S. President George W. Bush's iPod.

"Girl U Want" by Devo, from the album Freedom of Choice, was allegedly inspired by "My Sharona", although Devo's Gerald Casale has denied this.

During the 2020 COVID-19 pandemic, band bassist Prescott Niles released a guitar solo instruction video, in response to the many parodies of the song which had appeared during the pandemic.

In 2023, Berton Averre calculated to receive between 100,000 and 300,000 dollars yearly from his royalties for the song.

 Use in other media 
In video games, a cover of "My Sharona" is featured as downloadable content for the Rock Band series. This version was later updated for Rock Band 3 to support the Pro Guitar feature. The original version of the song, along with its music video, is featured on Lips: Party Classics on Xbox 360.

In films, the song was heard in the 1994 film Reality Bites, the 1997 Disney film RocketMan, the trailer for Charlie's Angels: Full Throttle, in J. J. Abrams' Super 8, Richard Linklater's Everybody Wants Some!!, and Changing Sides.

"My Sharona" was also used constantly in Saturday Night Live, for its recurring sketch "Janet Reno's Dance Party". 

In 2005, Gemmy Industries released a Frogz toy that sang a cover version of "My Sharona".

Charts

Weekly charts

 Year-end charts 

All-time charts

Sales and certifications

Covers, parodies, and samples 

Covers
 The song was covered by Finnish country band Steve 'N' Seagulls on their 2020 album Another Miracle.
 The song was covered by Swedish heavy metal band HammerFall on their 2009 album No Sacrifice, No Victory.
 The song was covered by Finnish rock band Leningrad Cowboys on their 2006 album Zombies Paradise.
The song was covered by American mathcore band The Number 12 Looks Like You on their 2005 EP An Inch of Gold for an Inch of Time.
 The song was covered by Serbian hard rock band Cactus Jack on their 2002 live album DisCover.
 The song was covered by Japanese new wave/rock band Polysics on their 2002 album For Young Electric Pop.
 The song was covered by Hong Kong pop singer Alan Tam on his 1980 album "愛到妳發狂" (English: "Loving You Until I am Crazy")
 The song was covered by British rock duo Royal Blood on the BBC Live Lounge.

Parodies
 "My Bologna" by "Weird Al" Yankovic – The 1979 song kickstarted Yankovic's career in song parody. The Knack approved of the parody and even had Yankovic inked to a one-off deal with their label, Capitol Records. A re-recorded version appeared on his eponymous début album.
 "Ayatollah" by Chicago radio personality Steve Dahl – The song covered current events related to the Iranian Revolution of 1979. It reached No. 12 on the weekly Musicradio survey of Chicago superstation WLS on February 9, 1980.
 "Pull My Strings" by the Dead Kennedys – The 1980 song used the guitar riff and changed the phrase from "My Sharona" to "My Payola" to satirize the music industry.
 "My Scrotum" by Cheech Marin – The song was featured in the 1980 film Cheech & Chong's Next Movie.
 "Nine Coronas" by John Mammoser – Originally recorded in 1987 with release in 1995, and with two follow-up versions ("10 Coronas" in 1996, and "9 Coronas ('99 version')" in 1999) that were showcased on the Dr. Demento radio programs.
 "Vaiche boa" by the Galician band Heredeiros da Crus – Released in 1997, on their album Des minutos.
 "Babylona" by Christian parody band ApologetiX – In 2001, this song was on their Keep the Change album.
 "Comme des Connards" ("Like Jerks") by the French comedian Michaël Youn – A parody for the 2004 film Les 11 commandements.
 "My Menorah" by American Comedy Network – a Flash parody in 2004 with singing candles.
 "My Toyota" by radio personality Bob Rivers – This was a video spoof of the Toyota Recall events in 2010.
 "My Fevola" – This was a parody sung on the AFL Footy Show about footballer Brendan Fevola.
 “My Pepperona” – In 2016, Hormel foods released a commercial with accordionist/trumpeter Alex Meixner playing a parody to advertise their brand new pepperoni.
 In 2020, multiple parodies were performed called "My Corona", referencing the coronavirus outbreak. These included YouTube medical personality Dr. Zubin Damania, and Inbar and Gilor Levi.
 The Knack band members Berton Averre and Prescott Nyles released a video of their own parody, titled "Bye, Corona!"

Audio samples
 Run–D.M.C. used an unauthorized audio sample from the song in their 1986 hit "It's Tricky". In 2006, Berton Averre and Doug Fieger filed suit against Apple, Run DMC and others for electronically redistributing the work. The case was settled in 2009.
 Rogue Traders used re-recorded elements of the riff in their 2006 hit "Watching You".
 Hip hop artists Everlast and DJ Lethal sampled the song for the track "I Got the Knack", which first appeared in the 1990 Everlast album Forever Everlasting.
 British girl group Girls Aloud incorporated parts of the song for the track "No Good Advice".

"Let Me Out"

The B-side of the "My Sharona" single was "Let Me Out". It was written by Fieger and Averre to fill the band's need for a strong opening track for concerts and later for their Get the Knack album. Averre has stated that the song is "absurdly fast." Drummer Bruce Gary felt that the words of "Let Me Out" helped make the song a perfect opener since the band wanted to "let out", and bassist Prescott Niles noted that, with the song, the band was all of a sudden "out of the box." Gary has also claimed that the song was "me trying to be Buddy Rich in a rock 'n' roll band. It was just full on."Billboard described "Let Me Out" as "a teen anthem delivered at full throttle" and praised the song's "delightful" harmonies, "slapping" guitars and "perfectly tuned" drumming. Superchunk and The Mountain Goats drummer Jon Wurster commented on the "full force" of Gary's drumming on "Let Me Out." Ira Robbins and Michael Sandlin of Trouser Press described the song as "tight guitar pop." Author John Borack described the song as "a damn fine pop tune." Audio magazine called it a "basher" with "plenty of style." AllMusic critic Mark Deming stated that the live version of "Let Me Out" has "a joyous force nearly any act would envy." Dave Swanson of Ultimate Classic Rock called it "one of the most powerful album openers ever."  Classic Rock History critic Skip Anderson called it a "smoking track" and rated it as the Knack's 10th best song.

A 1979 live performance of "Let Me Out" from Carnegie Hall was included on the laser disc of Live at Carnegie Hall. The song was included on their compilation album, Premium Gold Collection. A 2012 vinyl EP for Record Store Day includes 1978 live performances of "Let Me Out" and "My Sharona" from Los Angeles and two other songs. The two performances are also included on the live CD of the entire 1978 Los Angeles concert Havin' a Rave-Up''.

References

External links
 BBC News: Who was My Sharona?
 Classic Tracks: The Knack 'My Sharona'
 NPR: The Woman Behind 'My Sharona'
 Sharona Alperin's Web site

1979 debut singles
1979 songs
Billboard Hot 100 number-one singles
Capitol Records singles
Cashbox number-one singles
Number-one singles in Australia
RPM Top Singles number-one singles
Sabrina Salerno songs
Song recordings produced by Mike Chapman
Songs written by Berton Averre
Songs written by Doug Fieger
The Knack songs